is a Japanese voice actor who is affiliated with Production Baobab

Filmography

Television animation
 Naruto (2006), Toki
 Eden of the East (2009), Yūsei Kondō
 Brave Spirits Brave (2011), Jeraid
 Naruto Shippuden (2012), Kushimaru Kuriarare
 Fairy Tail (2012), Azuma, Gran Doma, and Warrod Sequen
 Overlord (2017), Gazef Stronoff
 Carole and Tuesday (2019), OG Bulldog
 Radiant (2019), Brangoire
 One Piece (2020), Gyukimaru
 Boruto: Naruto Next Generations (2020), Valleys Daimyo
 Yashahime: Princess Half-Demon (2020), Tōtetsu
 Beastars (2021), Riz
 The World Ends with You the Animation (2021), Megumi Kitaniji
 Tropical-Rouge! Pretty Cure (2021), Chongire
 Don't Hurt Me, My Healer! (2022), Mostly Bear
 Utawarerumono: Mask of Truth (2022), Munto

Original net animation
 Kengan Ashura (2019), Julius Reinhold, Shigeru Komada

Video games
 Injustice: Gods Among Us (2013), Bane
 Fire Emblem Heroes (2015), Caineghis
 Grimms Notes (2016), John Silver
 The Last Guardian (2016), 'Old man'
 Sushi Striker: The Way of Sushido (2018), Abricoth
 League of Legends (2009), Malcolm Graves
 Soulcalibur VI, Cervantes de Leon
 Resident Evil Village (2021), Karl Heisenberg
 Trek to Yomi (2022), Sanjuro
 Star Ocean: The Divine Force (2022), Aucerius Raimbaut
 Final Fantasy XVI (2023), Cidolfus Telamon

Tokusatsu
 Kamen Rider Saber (2020), Golem Megid (ep. 1)

Dubbing

Live-action
 16 Blocks, Capt. Dan Gruber (Casey Sander)
 21 Jump Street,  Capt. Dickson (Ice Cube)
 22 Jump Street, Capt. Dickson (Ice Cube)
 Accident Man, Milton (David Paymer)
 The Adjustment Bureau, Harry Mitchell (Anthony Mackie)
 Alien: Covenant, Cole (Uli Latukefu)
 Autómata, Wallace (Dylan McDermott)
 Captain Marvel, Ronan the Accuser (Lee Pace)
 Centurion, Bothos (David Morrissey)
 Chapter 27, Paul Goresh (Judah Friedlander)
 Cop Out, Poh Boy (Guillermo Díaz)
 Dark Phoenix, Ariki (Andrew Stehlin)
 Deliver Us from Evil, Mendoza (Édgar Ramírez)
 Doctor Sleep, Billy Freeman (Cliff Curtis)
 Dynasty, Michael Culhane (Robert Christopher Riley)
 Extreme Job, Chief Go (Ryu Seung-ryong)
 Four Christmases, Brad McVee (Vince Vaughn)
 Game of Thrones, Bronn (Jerome Flynn), Gregor Clegane (Conan Stevens)
 Get on Up, Bobby Byrd (Nelsan Ellis)
 Guardians of the Galaxy, Ronan the Accuser (Lee Pace)
 Halo, Captain Jacob Keyes (Danny Sapani)
 The Hate U Give, Maverick Carter (Russell Hornsby)
 I Love You, Man, Sydney (Jason Segel)
 Independence Day: Resurgence, Agent Matthew Travis (Gbenga Akinnagbe)
 Indiana Jones and the Temple of Doom (2009 WOWOW edition), Chen (Chua Kah Joo)
 Marley & Me, Sebastian Tunney (Eric Dane)
 Midway, Commander Joseph Rochefort (Brennan Brown)
 NCIS: New Orleans, Quentin Carter (Charles Michael Davis)
 Never Back Down 2: The Beatdown, Case Walker (Michael Jai White)
 Never Back Down: No Surrender, Case Walker (Michael Jai White)
 New Amsterdam, Dr. Floyd Reynolds (Jocko Sims)
 No Time to Die, Bill Tanner (Rory Kinnear)
 Once Upon a Time, Robin Hood (Sean Maguire)
 The Originals, Marcel Gerard (Charles Michael Davis)
 Pain & Gain, Adrian "Noel" Doorbal (Anthony Mackie)
 The Ridiculous 6, Chico Stockburn (Terry Crews)
 Running Wild with Bear Grylls, Rainn Wilson
 Scandal, Marcus Walker (Cornelius Smith Jr.)
 Suburbicon, Ira Sloan (Glenn Fleshler)
 Sushi Girl, Duke (Tony Todd)
 Tactical Force, SWAT Sergeant Tony Hunt (Michael Jai White)
 Turn Up Charlie, Charlie (Idris Elba)
 The Walking Dead, Tyreese Williams (Chad L. Coleman)
 War for the Planet of the Apes, Red (Ty Olsson)
 War Room, Tony Jordan (T.C. Stallings)
 Zero Dark Thirty, Dan Fuller (Jason Clarke)

Animation
 Teen Titans (2003), See-More
 Star Wars: The Clone Wars (2008), Turk Falso
 Wreck-It Ralph, (2013) Kohut
 My Little Pony: Friendship is Magic, (2013) Big Macintosh
 ParaNorman, (2013) Mr. Prenderghast
 Regular Show, (2013) Skips
 Planes: Fire & Rescue, (2014) Avalanche
 Clarence, (2015) Bucky O'Neil
 Star Wars Rebels, (2015) (Kanan Jarrus)
 Zootopia, (2016) Finnick
 The Lego Batman Movie, (2017) Bane

References

External links
 Official profile
 

1979 births
Living people
Japanese male voice actors
Male voice actors from Kanagawa Prefecture
Production Baobab voice actors